GetThru, formerly Relay, is an American company that provides a peer-to-peer political text messaging platform.

Daniel Souweine is a cofounder and CEO. He was the National Texting Program director for Bernie Sanders's 2016 campaign and has a B.A. in political science from Brown University.

Other political P2P texting platforms include Hustle on the Democratic side and RumbleUp and Opn Sesame on the Republican side.

History

Relay
Relay was created by 2016 Sanders campaign alumni and has been used by left-leaning campaigns and organizations such as ACLU and Alexandria Ocasio-Cortez.

GetThru
In April 2019, Relay was renamed to GetThru to avoid confusion with Relay Networks, a used telecom hardware seller in Minnesota.

See also 
 Relay (disambiguation)

References

External links
 

Text messaging